Rot is the fourth album by German, electro-industrial/aggrotech band, [:SITD:]. It was released in 2009 on the Accession Records label in Germany and on the Metropolis Records label in the United States. Accession Records also released a deluxe edition containing a bonus disc.

Track listing
 "The Insanity of Normality" – 1:43
 "Catharsis (Heal Me, Control Me)" – 4:40
 "Rot V.1.0" – 5:57
 "Stigmata of Jesus" – 5:07
 "Zodiac" – 4:55
 "Pride" – 6:03
 "Redemption" – 5:23
 "Frontal" – 4:34	
 "Pharmakon" – 6:32	
 "MK Ultra" – 5:02	
 "Destination" – 4:51

Bonus Disc
 "The Insanity of Normality (Final)" – 4:26	
 "Rot V.2.0 (Extended)" – 8:18	
 "Rot [Remix by Reaper]" – 5:09	
 "Redemption [Remix by Project Pitchfork]" – 6:42	
 "Rot [Remix by S.A.M.]" – 4:45	
 "Rot [Remix by Aesthetic Perfection]" – 5:09	
 "Heldenhaft (Vox) [feat. Othura]" – 2:18

References

2009 albums
Accession Records albums
Metropolis Records albums